Frost is a novel by Robin Wayne Bailey published in 1983.

Plot summary
Frost is a novel in which a raven-hairad warrior-witch on gets caught up in an apocalyptic war.

Reception
Colin Greenland reviewed Frost for Imagine magazine, and stated that "Bailey [...] shares Moorcock's preference for attractive characters with chips on their shoulders, and for sending them on terrifying quests with no information and half their powers taken away before they start. It's hard work, heroism."

Reviews
Review by David V. Barrett (1985) in Vector 124/125

References

1983 novels